The Boys' Singles tournament of the 2016 Badminton Asia Junior Championships was held from July 13–17. The defending champions of the last edition is Lin Guipu from China. Kantaphon Wangcharoen, Chirag Sen and Koki Watanabe were the top 3 seeded this year. Sun Feixiang of China emerged as the champion after beat Lee Chia-hao of Chinese Taipei in the finals with the score 21–13, 21–15.

Seeded

  Kantaphon Wangcharoen (quarter-final)
  Chirag Sen (withdrew)
  Koki Watanabe (fourth round)
  Lee Zii Jia (quarter-final)
  Pachaarapol Nipornram (quarter-final)
  Korakrit Laotrakul (quarter-final)
  Lee Chia-hao (final)
  Sun Feixiang (champion)
  Ryan Ng Zin Rei (third round)
  Kandis Wanaroon (second round)
  Ramadhani Muhammad Zulkifli (fourth round)
  Kittipong Imnark (second round)
  Chico Aura Dwi Wardoyo (third round)
  Leong Jun Hao (fourth round)
  Lakshya Sen (semi-final)
  Mark Shelley Alcala (withdrew)

Draw

Finals

Top Half

Section 1

Section 2

Section 3

Section 4

Bottom Half

Section 5

Section 6

Section 7

Section 8

References

External links 
Main Draw

2016 Badminton Asia Junior Championships